Panshan may refer to:

Mount Pan, mountain in Ji County, Tianjin, China
Panshan County, in Liaoning, China